Discretionary jurisdiction is a power that allows a court to decide whether to hear a particular case brought before it. Typically, the highest court in a state or country will have discretionary jurisdiction. In contrast, the lower courts have no such power. For this reason, the lower courts must entertain any case properly filed, so long as the court has subject matter jurisdiction over the questions of law and in personam jurisdiction over the parties to the case.

Arguably, discretionary jurisdiction is reactive rather than proactive. In other words, appellate courts do not search for cases or issues to review. Rather, the court’s exercise of discretion is in response to a petitioner’s appeal of a lower court’s decision or in a motion for rehearing. See United States v. WIlliams Alternatively, a minority of courts require a petitioner to file a separate document called a “notice to invoke jurisdiction." See generally Wells v. State, 132 So. 3d 1110 (2014). 

The power is coined as “discretionary jurisdiction” because a court may choose whether to accept or deny the petitioner’s appeal. 

The highest court's assignment of discretion is because appellate courts in common law countries have two basic functions: "error correction" and "law declaring."

The "error correction" function allows the appellate court to examine the record to determine whether the lower court applied existing law correctly and reverses and remands (sends the case back) for severe errors.  That is, the parties may generally agree on the applicable law, but the appellant will contend that the trial court incorrectly interpreted and applied the existing law.

The "law declaring" function means that the appellate court rules on novel issues in a case, and under stare decisis, those rulings become new law in themselves.  In those cases, the parties disagree vigorously if any existing legal rule even applies to the facts of the case, or the appellant may be deliberately trying to attack an established rule in the hope that the appellate court will overturn a prior decision and establish a new rule, or the question has been ruled upon by multiple intermediate appellate courts and is so perplexing that all the lower courts disagree with each other.

An appellate court with discretionary jurisdiction is able to delegate error correction to lower courts, while it focuses its limited resources on developing case law properly.  In the latter situation, the appellate court will focus on truly novel questions or revisiting older legal rules that are now clearly obsolete or unconstitutional.

For example, the United States Supreme Court hears cases by a writ of certiorari, essentially meaning that it calls appellants up to the court only if their case is important enough to merit the resources of the court.  The Supreme Court employs a "rule of four," meaning that four justices have to think the case is important enough to hear before the court will grant it a review. Many state supreme courts use a similar process to choose which cases they will hear.

References

Civil procedure
Jurisdiction